Together We Are The Love Vortex is the second release by American Electronic Art rock band The Tempers, self-released on 6 July 2012.
A Music video for the track "You Must Be Crazy" was released following Together We Are The Love Vortex.

Track listing
All tracks written and composed by The Tempers.

Personnel
Corina Bakker- Vocals, Artwork
Chalia Bakker- Drums
James Bakker- Synthesizer, Bass, Guitar, Engineer
Anastasia Kiryanova- Photography
Eddy Schreyer/ Oasis- Mastering

References

2012 EPs
The Tempers EPs